Rohan Jayasekera may refer to:

Rohan Jayasekera (cricketer), former cricketer who represented Sri Lanka and Canada
Rohan Jayasekera (writer), Associate Editor of Index on Censorship

ta:ரொகான் ஜயசேகர